The Finlay Institute (Instituto Finlay de Vacunas lit. Finlay Vaccine Institute) is a Cuban organization that carries out medical research and mainly produces vaccines. It is named after the Cuban doctor Carlos Finlay who was the first to hypothesize the involvement of a mosquito as a vector of yellow fever.

In response to fight against COVID-19, Finlay Institute has developed the Soberana 02. In March 2021, Vicente Vérez, director of the Finlay Institute, announced a delay in the development of vaccines and indicated the start of vaccination of the Cuban population in July 2021.

References 

Medical research institutes in Cuba
Research institutes established in 1991
COVID-19 vaccine producers